As of January 2023, Gol Transportes Aéreos serves the following destinations:

List

Additionally, Gol operates dedicated executive bus services between São Paulo airports for its passengers and affiliate airlines:

São Paulo–Congonhas Airport and São Paulo/Guarulhos – Gov. André Franco Montoro International Airport

References

Lists of airline destinations
Gol Transportes Aéreos